G4 Underground is a cable television newsmagazine series airing on G4 hosted by Morgan Webb. "G4 Underground" was described as having a similar format of ABC's 20/20, except it takes a look at many topics that most major news programs don't cover such as Porn 2.0, Urban Spelunking and Salvia Divinorum.

References

External links 

2000s American television news shows
2009 American television series debuts
2009 American television series endings
G4 (American TV network) original programming